Walter Donald Douglas (April 21, 1861 – April 15, 1912) was an American business executive who traveled first class aboard the Titanic with his wife, Mahala, and maid, Berthe Leroy, in cabin C-86.

Early life and businesses
Douglas was born in Waterloo, Iowa to George Douglas and Margaret Boyd Douglas. His parents had both immigrated to the United States; George Douglas was Scottish and Margaret Boyd was Irish. George Douglas was one of the co-founders of the Quaker Oats Company.

After attending high school, Douglas attended the Shattuck Military Academy in Faribault, Minnesota. He married Lulu Camp on May 19, 1884, with whom he had two sons, Edward Bruce and George Camp. Lulu died in December 1899, and eight years later, on November 6, 1907, Douglas was married to Mahala Dutton.

Douglas and his brother George founded the Douglas Starchworks, at the time the largest starch factory west of the Mississippi. The Starchworks later became Penick and Ford and subsequently, Penford Food Ingredients, a division of Penford Corporation. He also had interests in the linseed oil business in Minneapolis, manufacturing under the name of the Midland Linseed Oil Company, which was sold in 1899 to the American Linseed Oil Company, eventually evolving into the Archer Daniels Midland Company. In 1899, after selling his linseed business, Douglas became a partner with Piper, Johnson & Case, a grain firm, where he remained until he retired in 1912.

Douglas was associated with several businesses, including the Canadian Elevator Company, the Monarch Lumber Company and the Saskatchewan Valley Land Company, among others. He was also a stockholder, executive board member, and one of the directors of the Empire Elevator Company, and was a member of the executive board of the Quaker Oats Company. He was also among the directors of the First National Bank of Minneapolis.

RMS Titanic
Douglas, who had retired on 1 January 1912, was known as a "Captain of Industry," having amassed a fortune of over $4 million. He and his wife spent three months in Europe looking for furnishings for their new home near Lake Minnetonka before booking return passage to the United States aboard the RMS Titanic. Douglas died in the sinking, and his body was the 62nd to be recovered by the CS Mackay-Bennett. The following was recorded in the Mackey-Bennett'''s logbook:

As he was easily identifiable as a first-class passenger, Douglas' body was not buried at sea, instead being embalmed and brought to Canada aboard the Mackey-Bennett''. It was subsequently taken to Cedar Rapids to be buried in the Douglas family mausoleum at Oak Hill Cemetery. His wife survived the sinking along with their maid. Mahala Douglas was the very first survivor to board the RMS Carpathia in the early morning hours of 15 April. Upon her death in 1945 she was buried beside him.

A provision in Douglas' will required that George C. Douglas, his younger son from his first marriage, earn $2,500 in two consecutive years, in order to receive his share of the estate, but this provision was waived by the trustees of the will because the son had served in the British Army for five years during World War I, being wounded twice and being cited for bravery by Field Marshal Lord French.

References

External links
encyclopediatitanica:Mr Walter Donald Douglas

1861 births
1912 deaths
Deaths on the RMS Titanic
American people of British descent
People from Waterloo, Iowa
People from Cedar Rapids, Iowa
19th-century American businesspeople